Games Rednecks Play is an album by American comedian Jeff Foxworthy. It was released by Warner Bros. Records on July 18, 1995. The album peaked at number 8 on the Billboard 200 chart and has been certified 3× Platinum by the RIAA. As of 2011, it still stands as Jeff Foxworthy's best-selling album, with 2,084,000 copies sold in the US.

Track listing
All tracks written by Jeff Foxworthy except where noted.
"Introduction" – 1:46
"Victoria's Secret" – 4:03
"Games Rednecks Play" – 3:55
"Southern Accent" – 2:24
"NASA & Alabama & Fishing Shows" – 3:20
"Clampetts Go to Maui" – 6:51
"I Love Being a Parent" – 8:46
"Out of the Gene Pool" – 3:30
"Seek and Destroy" – 4:00
"Don't Drink and Drive" – 5:17
"More You Might Be a Redneck If…" – 3:28
"Party All Night" (Scott Rouse) – 3:06
with Little Texas and Scott Rouse

Charts

Weekly charts

Year-end charts

References

1995 albums
Jeff Foxworthy albums
Warner Records albums
1990s comedy albums